Bad Taste Records is a record label based in Lund, Sweden.

The record label was one of the first labels to establish in the Swedish punk rock and punk/hardcore scene in the early 1990s, together with Burning Heart Records. The name of the label originated from the movie Bad Taste by Peter Jackson.

The first release was put out in 1994, the EP Skate to Hell by Satanic Surfers. For a couple of years, they worked together with the record shop Love Your Records.

Today, the label has somewhat diversified, drifting from their original exclusive punk/hardcore orientation towards a more rock/emo/rap orientation.

Acts 
Bands and other acts that have released records under the Bad Taste Records label include:

 All Systems Go!
  Astream
 Chixdiggit
 CunninLynguists
 Danko Jones
 David & the Citizens
 Denison Witmer
 Dropnose
 Four Square
 Early to Bed
 ELWD
 Embee
 Hard-Ons
 Intensity
 Joey Cape
 Langhorns
 Last Days of April
 Logh
 Looptroop Rockers
 Misconduct
 Mohammed Ali
 Navid Modiri & Gudarna
 Once Just
 Pridebowl
 Promoe
 Pyramid Vritra
 Sahara Hotnights
 Satanic Surfers
 Svenska Akademien
 Turtlehead
 Quit Your Dayjob
 Within Reach

External links
 
 Bad Taste Events website
 Bad Taste Records YouTube site

Swedish record labels
Punk record labels
Companies based in Lund